Stephan Benson Gibralter  is a former Major League Baseball player who was born in Dallas, Texas on October 9, 1972. He played parts of two seasons for the Cincinnati Reds. He was drafted by the Cincinnati Reds in the 6th round of the 1990 amateur draft. His Major League debut came on June 1, 1995.

Career statistics 

Baseball-Reference

Cincinnati Reds players
Major League Baseball outfielders
Baseball players from Dallas
1972 births
Living people
Charlotte Knights players
People from Duncanville, Texas
Long Island Ducks players
Cedar Rapids Reds players
Charleston Wheelers players
Chattanooga Lookouts players
Gulf Coast Reds players
Indianapolis Indians players
Omaha Golden Spikes players
Duncanville High School alumni